PFC Pirin Blagoevgrad was a Bulgarian professional football club based in Blagoevgrad.

History

Makedonska slava

Club was founded in 1928 as Makedonska Slava ("Macedonian Glory"). In 1948 the club joined the newly established FD Julius Dermendzhiev and cease its independent existence. In 2000 Makedonska Slava was restored after unification with Granit Stara Kresna.

In 2002–03 season was successful for the club, which finished 2nd, and won promotion to the A PFG for first time in the club's history.

Pirin Blagoevgrad

Several years later, under the hand of the new owner Nikolay Galchev, the football club renamed to Pirin 1922 in the 2004/05 season and returned again to top flight football for the next, 2005–06 season. In autumn 2006 the club's name was once again renamed to PFC Pirin Blagoevgrad. The following 2007/08 season, Pirin Blagoevgrad won the Western B PFG and the club joined the A PFG.

Union
In December 2008, club was merged with FC Pirin, which played in the Western B PFG. The new club was named FC Pirin Blagoevgrad and is officially the rightful holder of the club records of the former Pirin, which has played more than 20 seasons in the top flight.

Notable players
Note: For a complete list of PFC Pirin Blagoevgrad players, see :Category:PFC Pirin Blagoevgrad players.

References

Football clubs in Blagoevgrad
Association football clubs established in 1922
Association football clubs disestablished in 2008
Defunct football clubs in Bulgaria
1922 establishments in Bulgaria
2008 disestablishments in Bulgaria